Gennes is the name of several communes in France:

 Gennes, Doubs, in the Doubs département
 Gennes, Maine-et-Loire, in the Maine-et-Loire département
Gennes-Ivergny, in the Pas-de-Calais département
Gennes-sur-Glaize, in the Mayenne département
Gennes-sur-Seiche, in the Ille-et-Vilaine département

See also

 De Gennes (disambiguation)